Tetronarce californica also known as the Pacific electric ray is a species of electric ray in the family Torpedinidae, endemic to the coastal waters of the northeastern Pacific Ocean from Baja California to British Columbia. Its body form is typical of the genus, with a rounded pectoral fin disc wider than long and a thick tail bearing two dorsal fins of unequal size and a well-developed caudal fin.

Solitary and nocturnal, the Pacific electric ray can generate up to 45 volts of electricity for the purposes of subduing prey or self-defense. It feeds mainly on bony fishes, ambushing them from the substrate during the day and actively hunting for them at night. Reproduction is aplacental viviparous, meaning that the embryos are initially nourished by yolk, later supplemented by histotroph ("uterine milk") produced by the mother. Females bear litters of 17–20 pups, probably once every other year. Care should be exercised around the Pacific electric ray, as it has been known to act aggressively if provoked and its electric shock can potentially incapacitate a diver. It and other electric rays are used as model organisms for biomedical research. The International Union for Conservation of Nature (IUCN) has listed this species under Least Concern, as it is not fished in any significant numbers.

Taxonomy
The Pacific electric ray was described by American ichthyologist William Orville Ayres, the first Curator of Ichthyology at the California Academy of Sciences, who named it after the U.S. state where it was first discovered by science. Ayers published his account in 1855, in the inaugural volume of the Academy's Proceedings; no type specimens were designated. In 1861, Theodore Gill placed this species in his newly created genus Tetronarce, on the basis of its smooth-rimmed spiracles. Later authors have generally regarded Tetronarce as a subgenus of Torpedo. Closely similar electric rays found off Peru, Chile, and Japan may be the same as this species. Other common names used for this ray include California torpedo ray, Pacific torpedo, or simply electric ray or torpedo ray. This species is placed in the genus Tetronarce.

Distribution and habitat
The only electric ray found off western North America, the Pacific electric ray occurs as far south as Sebastian Vizcaino Bay in Baja California, and as far north as the Dixon Entrance in northern British Columbia. It is most common south of Point Conception, California, with the rays north of the Point perhaps representing one or more separate populations.

It frequents sandy flats, rocky reefs, and kelp forests.

Description

The Pacific electric ray has a soft, flabby body devoid of dermal denticles. It has an oval pectoral fin disc about 1.2 times as wide as long, with a nearly straight front margin and a pair of kidney-shaped electric organs visible beneath the skin. The eyes are small and followed by smooth-rimmed spiracles; the space from the spiracles to the snout tip is about 1.8 times the distance between the spiracles. There is a curtain of skin between the nostrils that almost reaches the mouth, which is arched with deep furrows at the corners. The distance between the mouth and the snout tip is about equal to the mouth width, and three times that of the distance between the nostrils. There are 25–28 upper tooth rows and 19–26 lower tooth rows; each tooth is tiny and smooth, with a single sharp cusp. Pacific electric rays are founded in Japan, south Kuril Islands, and Kinmei Seamount; Wiah Point, Graham Island, northern British Columbia to Todos Santos, southern Baja California, including Isla Guadalupe, central Baja California, and Peru. Although there was one record from the Gulf of California. Common from about San Francisco Bay southward into southern Baja California. Pacific electric rays can grow up to a length more than 140 cm (55.1 in), and 18–23 cm (7.1-9.1 in) at birth. Pacific electric rays are able to swim to a depth from the surf zone to 1,079 m (3,539 ft), usually shallower than 300 m (984 ft).

Two dorsal fins are present, with the first more than twice the size of the second and positioned opposite the large pelvic fins. The tail is short and stocky, terminating in a large, triangular caudal fin with a nearly straight trailing margin. This ray is dark gray, slate, or brown above, sometimes with small darker spots that increase in number with age; the underside is white.

Biology and ecology
With a sizable oily liver and low-density tissues, the Pacific electric ray is almost neutrally buoyant and can hover in the water column with very little effort. Propulsive power is provided by the muscular tail, while the disc is held rigid. Telemetry studies have shown that this species swims primarily at night, when it enters reefs and other habitats with high terrain relief, and spends most of the day in nearby open areas buried in sediment. It is nomadic and solitary, though several individuals may rest within the same area.

Like other members of its family, the Pacific electric ray produces powerful electric shocks for attack and defense. Its paired electric organs are derived from muscle and comprise approximately 15% of its total weight, consisting of many thousands of jelly-filled "electric plates" stacked hundreds-high into vertical hexagonal columns. These columns function essentially like batteries connected in parallel; a large adult ray can generate some 45 volts of electricity with a power output of one kilowatt, due to low internal resistance. The electric organs discharge direct current in pulses, each lasting 4–5 ms. When attacking prey, in the first few moments the ray normally produces pulses at a rate of 150–200 per second, slowing down over time. Over a thousand pulses may be produced in all, depending on how long it takes for the prey to be subdued. The pulse rate increases with water temperature.

Because of its large size and formidable defenses, The Pacific electric ray seldom falls prey to other animals. There is a record of one being fed upon by a killer whale (Orcinus orca) off Santa Catalina Island. The Cooper's nutmeg (Cancellaria cooperi) is a specialized parasite of this ray, and possibly other bottom-dwelling fishes such as the Pacific angelshark (Squatina californica). The snail is attracted to the chemicals contained in the ray's surface mucus; it makes a small cut on the ventral surface of the ray and uses its proboscis to suck blood. Other known parasites of this species include the copepod Trebius latifurcatus, the fluke Amphibdelloides maccallumi, and the tapeworm Acanthobothrium hispidum.

Feeding

The Pacific electric ray feeds mainly on bony fishes, including anchovies, herring, hake, mackerel, croakers, rockfishes, surfperches, kelp bass, and flatfishes, but will also take cephalopods and invertebrates given the opportunity. During the day, the Pacific electric ray is an ambush predator: when a fish approaches its head, the ray "jumps" forward from its resting place and folds down its disc to envelop it, while delivering strong shocks. Once the fish is subdued, the ray repositions itself to swallow it head-first. The entire process takes about two minutes.

At night, when many diurnal fishes descend from the water column and become inactive a short distance above the bottom, the Pacific electric ray switches to an active hunting strategy. To better secure the fish within its disc, the ray will make short kicks with its tail that sometimes send it into barrel rolls or somersaults. Finally, the stunned prey is maneuvered to the mouth with ripples of the disc. Nighttime seine net sampling at the surface of Monterey Bay has captured Pacific electric rays in surprising numbers, suggesting that they rise upward from the bottom to feed on small fishes.

Though the Pacific electric ray will feed at any hour, it responds to prey much more quickly at night than during the day. Most prey captures occur in darkness or turbid conditions, when its eyes are largely useless. Instead, it relies on electroreception via its ampullae of Lorenzini to locate food. Experiments in the field have shown that it will attack artificially generated electric fields and conductive metal electrodes. Mechanical sensory cues, detected via the lateral line, also play an important role: this species has been observed preferentially attacking faster-moving prey even if a closer food item was available.

Life history
The Pacific electric ray exhibits aplacental viviparity, with the developing embryos at first receiving nourishment from yolk, and later from histotroph ("uterine milk", enriched with proteins, fat, and mucus) produced by the mother and delivered through specialized outgrowths of the uterine lining. Mature females have two functional ovaries and uteruses. Reproduction occurs year-round, with males apparently capable of mating every year and females every other year. The gestation period is unknown. Reported litter sizes range from 17 to 20; at least the number of ova, and perhaps also the number of young, increases with the size of the female.

Male grow faster than females but reach a smaller ultimate size. The oldest documented individuals are 16 years of age, and extrapolating from growth curves the maximum lifespan of this species may be upwards of 24 years.

Human interactions

The shock generated by the Pacific electric ray can be enough to knock down an adult human. It should be treated with caution, especially at night when it is active, and has been known to charge at divers with its mouth agape if harassed. It is not known to be responsible for any fatalities, but may have been involved in several unexplained, fatal diving accidents. This species fares poorly in captivity, as it usually refuses to feed when first introduced into an aquarium. Since 2000, the Aquarium of the Bay and the Monterey Bay Aquarium have had some success keeping Pacific electric rays by offering them moving food.

The Pacific electric ray and its relatives are used as model organisms for biomedical research, because their electric organs contain an abundance of important nervous system proteins such as nicotinic acetylcholine receptor and acetylcholinesterase. In the 1970s and 1980s, acetylcholine receptors from this species and the marbled electric ray (T. marmorata) became the first neurotransmitter receptors to be isolated and sequenced, in what is considered to be a landmark success in the field of neurobiology. This led to a number of further advances, one of the most significant being the elucidation of the pathophysiology underlying the disease myasthenia gravis. A small commercial fishery in southern California supplies Pacific electric rays for research purposes; as of 2005 this fishery may have employed as few as two fishers. Otherwise, this ray has no economic value. It is caught incidentally by commercial trawl and gillnet fisheries, and on hook-and-line by sport anglers. These activities appear to have little impact on its population, leading it to be listed under Least Concern by the International Union for Conservation of Nature (IUCN). Fishing for this ray is not managed by the Pacific Fishery Management Council.

References

Strongly electric fish
Fish of the Pacific Ocean
Western North American coastal fauna
Fish of the Western United States
Fauna of California
Fish of Canada
Fish of the Gulf of California
Fish of Mexican Pacific coast
Fish described in 1855
Tetronarce